Andrew Mevis (born October 12, 1998) is an American football placekicker who is a free agent. He played college football at Fordham and Iowa State.

Professional career
After going unselected in the 2022 NFL Draft, Mevis was signed by the Jacksonville Jaguars as an undrafted free agent.
Mevis was cut by the Jaguars on July 29, 2022, as Jacksonville tried out 4 kickers following Mevis going 1-4 on field goals during a practice session the day before on July 28. Jacksonville signed kicker Elliott Fry as Mevis's replacement.

Personal life
He is the older brother of Missouri kicker Harrison Mevis.

References

External links
Jacksonville Jaguars bio
 Iowa State Cyclones bio

1998 births
Living people
People from Warsaw, Indiana
Players of American football from Indiana
American football placekickers
Fordham Rams football players
Iowa State Cyclones football players
Jacksonville Jaguars players